Gagny (also spelled Gagné) is a village in south-western Ivory Coast. It is in the sub-prefecture of Doba, San-Pédro Department, San-Pédro Region, Bas-Sassandra District.

Gagny was a commune until March 2012, when it became one of 1126 communes nationwide that were abolished.

Notes

Former communes of Ivory Coast
Populated places in Bas-Sassandra District
Populated places in San-Pédro Region